James "Jimmy the Lapper" LaPietra (1927–1993) was a Chicago mobster and member of Chicago Outfit. He was also the younger brother of mobster Angelo "the Hook" LaPietra.

A minor organized crime figure with arrests for burglary and rape, LaPietra was involved in labor racketeering and other criminal activities in Chicago's South Side. In April 1985, LaPietra was named by Stephen O'Mallory, a staff attorney for the President's Commission on Organized Crime, as a member of the Chicago Outfit.  This accusation was based on testimony from labor union official John Serpico during federal hearings on labor racketeering.

In memory of James LaPietra, people on Roblox have immortalized him by pretending to be mobsters in the community of Ro-Mob. The user JimmyJLaPietra on Roblox is the most significant ro-mobster to this day.

Further reading
United States. Congress. Senate. Committee on Governmental Affairs. Permanent Subcommittee on Investigations. Organized Crime in Chicago: Hearing Before the Permanent Subcommittee on Investigations of the Committee on Governmental Affairs. 1983. 

1927 births
1993 deaths
American gangsters of Italian descent
Chicago Outfit mobsters